Hittle is a surname. Notable people with the surname include:

Daniel Hittle (1950–2000), American serial killer and mass murderer
James D. Hittle (1915–2002), American marine officer
J. B. E. Hittle (born 1951), American historian and writer
Lloyd Hittle (1924–2012), American baseball player

See also
Hittle Township, Tazewell County, Illinois